Dies Domini is an apostolic letter promulgated by Pope John Paul II on July 30, 1998. In this doctrine, Pope John Paul encourages the Catholic population to 'rediscover the meaning' behind keeping the Lord's Day holy.

Pope John Paul II explains the meaning of the Sunday in the light of Christian tradition. To celebrate Sunday is to make present the graces of the Paschal mystery, which is the climax of the salvation history:

It is the day which recalls in grateful adoration the world’s first day and looks forward in active hope to the ’last day,’ when Christ will come in glory and all things will be made new.”  Sunday recalls the day of Christ's Resurrection. This is a tradition going back to the Apostles, taking its origin from the actual day of Christ’s Resurrection—a day thus appropriately designated “the Lord’s Day.”

Speaking of the various dimensions of the Christian celebration of Sunday, the document declares that it is Dies Domini with regard to the work of creation, Dies Christi as the day of the new creation and the Risen Lord’s gift of the Holy Spirit, Dies Ecclesiae as the day on which the Christian community gathers for the celebration, and Dies Hominis as the day of joy, rest and fraternal charity.

Contents
 Opening Section (1-7)
 Chapter 1 - DIES DOMINI: The Celebration of the Creator's Work (8-18)
 Chapter 2 - DIES CHRISTI: The Day of the Risen Lord and of the Gift of the Holy Spirit (19-30)
 Chapter 3 - DIES ECCLESIAE: The Eucharistic Assembly: Heart of Sunday (31-54)
 Chapter 4 - DIES HOMINIS: Sunday: Day of Joy, Rest and Solidarity (55-73)
 Chapter 5 - DIES DIERUM: Sunday: the Primordial Feast, Revealing the Meaning of Time (74-80)
 CONCLUSION (81-87)

See also 
Sabbath in Christianity
Sacrosanctum Concilium

References

Bibliography 

 John Paul II, (1998) Apostolic letter ''On Keeping the Lord's Day Holy "Dies Domini"; see the text on-line: APOSTOLIC LETTER DIES DOMINI. Access date:2018-12-09

Catholic theology and doctrine